Somali studies is the scholarly term for research concerning Somalis and Greater Somalia. It consists of several disciplines such as anthropology, sociology, linguistics, historiography and archaeology. The field draws from old Somali chronicles, records and oral literature, in addition to written accounts and traditions about Somalis from explorers and geographers in the Horn of Africa and the Middle East. The Somali Studies International Association is the primary organization for Somalist scholars. Bildhaan, Somali Studies, Horn of Africa and the Anglo-Somali Society Journal likewise serve as the field's main periodicals. Since 1980, prominent Somalist scholars from around the world have also gathered annually to hold the International Congress of Somali Studies.

History
The academic platform that would become Somali studies has its formal origins with religious, linguistic and historical research done by 18th and 19th century Somali scholars, such as Uways al-Barawi and Shaykh Aidarus. However, Somalis since antiquity have exchanged ideas with polities in North Africa, West Asia, South Asia and as far as East Asia. Through early 20th century scholars like Osman Yusuf Kenadid and the polymath Musa Haji Ismail Galal, other disciplines such as anthropology, sociology and archaeology would eventually form part of Somali studies.

Kenadid published many works on various subjects related to Somali history and science, including textbooks on the Somali language, astronomy, geography and Somali philosophy. He borrowed significantly from the vast ancient Somali cultural repository, working towards a renaissance of this rich past. Galal later documented the Somali astrological, meteorological and calendrical systems. He devoted two major works to traditional Somali science, The terminology and practice of Somali weather lore, astronomy, and astrology (1968) and Stars, seasons and weather in Somali pastoral traditions (1970), both of which are regarded as classics in Somali studies.

Fields of study

Archaeology
 
One of the earliest examples of archaeology in Somalia can be traced back to the 19th century when George Revoil a French explorer excavated several ancient sites in northern Somalia where he found large quantities of glass and pottery, including Roman pottery. After independence, Somali government officials in collaboration with Soviet and British archaeologists began excavating various parts of Somalia during the 1970s. In late 1975, Neville Chittick led a British-Somali archaeological expedition in the northern half of Somalia. Financed by the Somali authorities, the reconnaissance mission found numerous examples of historical artefacts and structures, including ancient coins, pottery, drystone buildings, cairns, mosques, walled enclosures, standing stones and platform monuments. Many of the finds were of pre-Islamic origin and associated with ancient settlements described by the 1st century Periplus of the Erythraean Sea, among other documents.

Anthropology
Somali anthropology studies the way of life of the Somali people. Somalist anthropologists have in various books and papers documented traditional Somali social systems such as the ancient Xeer (customary law) and the clan system, and examined their role within Somali society. In the field of Somali Islamic studies, scholars like Ioan Lewis, Said Sheikh Samatar and Lee V. Cassanelli have written on the traditional Muslim structure of Somali society in books such as A Pastoral Democracy: A Study of Pastoralism and Politics Among the Northern Somali of the Horn of Africa (1961), Oral poetry and Somali nationalism: the case of Sayyid Mahammad 'Abdille Hasan (1982) and The Shaping of Somali Society: Reconstructing the History of a Pastoral People, 1600 to 1900 (1982).<ref>(Review) Oral poetry and Somali nationalism: the case of Sayyid Mahammad 'Abdille Hasan (1982) by John William Johnson pg 601 - Research in African Literatures, 1984</ref> Enrico Cerulli and Mohamed Diriye Abdullahi in their respective works Somalia: scritti vari editi ed inediti (1957) and Culture and Customs of Somalia (2001) have also summarized the origins and ethnogenesis of the Somali people.

Linguistics
In terms of linguistics, Somali studies examines the inter-relationships between the Somali language and other related Afro-Asiatic languages. Somali is by far the best documented language from the Cushitic branch of Afro-Asiatic, with academic studies of it dating from before 1900. Linguists such as Bogumil Witalis Andrzejewski, Giorgio Banti, Annarita Puglielli, Cabdalla Cumar Mansuur, Mohamed Haji Rabi, Mohamed Diriye Abdullahi and Martin Orwin are considered among the foremost scholars on the study of the Somali languageThe Internet Medium and Poetry Transmission by Abdisalam M. Issa-Salwe and the relation it has to the tongues spoken by related neighboring ethnic groups, such as the Afars, Oromos and Bejas. Mustafa Abdullahi Feiruz also focuses on the standardization of written Somali, and Somali language's links with Arabic.Somali Studies International Congress - Djibouti- Phase II - December 13th, 14th, 15th 2007

Organizations
The primary organization overseeing the field is the Somali Studies International Association.Article about SSIA

Journals
Peer-reviewedBildhaan: An International Journal of Somali StudiesHorn of Africa: An Independent Journal
 Journal of Somali Studies
 Somali Studies: A Peer-Reviewed Academic Journal for Somali Studies
 Anglo-Somali Society Journal

Other

Conferences
Since its inaugural gathering in Mogadishu between July 6-13th, 1980, the International Congress of Somali Studies has been held to discuss developments in the field. The 10th Congress was held in Djibouti City in December 2007. The triennial Somali Studies Conference also brings together some scholars and specialists in Somali studies. As of 2021, Jigjiga has hosted the 14th International Congress of Somali Studies.Award ceremonies
Since the early 1970s, the Academy of Somali Studies began to hold professional award-winning poetry competitions after having been inspired by the traditional poetry competitions annually held throughout Somalia. The Somali Studies Association recognizes Somali scholars whose work concerning Somali studies stands out with the Musa Galaal award'', a prize named after the Somali polymath Musa Haji Ismail Galal. In 1994, Charles L. Geshekter, Professor of History at California State University, Chico, created an endowment for this award. Geshekter's mother and Musa Galaal (1914–1980) were friends. A financial prize is also awarded annually.

Prominent Somalist scholars

Abdillahi Diiriye Guled - Literature and Linguistics
Bogumil Witalis Andrzejewski – linguistics
Enrico Cerulli – history and linguistics
Ali Jimale Ahmed – history and linguistics
David D. Laitin – politics and history
Abdi Mohamed Kusow – sociology and anthropology
Abdi Ismail Samatar – geography
Ahmed Ismail Samatar – international relations
Jama Musse Jama – ethnomathematics, computational linguistics
Harold C. Fleming – anthropology and linguistics
Kenneth Menkhaus - political science
Ali A. Abdi - anthropology and sociology
Martin Orwin – linguistics
Mohamed Abdi Mohamed – anthropology
Mohamed Diriye Abdullahi – linguistics
Mohamed Haji Mukhtar – history
Musa Haji Ismail Galal – history and linguistics
Neville Chittick – history and archaeology
Said Sheikh Samatar – linguistics and sociology
Sada Mire – archaeology and history 
Hussein M. Adam – politics and history
 Hamdi Sh. Mohamed  - Women History

See also
Ethiopian Studies
African Studies
Middle Eastern Studies
Islamic Studies

Notes

References
Proceedings of the First International Congress of Somali Studies, edited by Adam M. Hussein and Charles L. Geshekter. Atlanta: Scholars Press, 1992.
Proceedings of the Second International Congress of Somali Studies by T. Labahn, 1984
Somali Studies: Land of the People by Anita Suleiman, 1991

Further reading

External links
 Bildhaan: An International Journal of Somali Studies
 SOMALI STUDIES: A Peer-Reviewed Academic Journal for Somali Studies
 Somaliland Journal of African Studies (SJAS)
 Somali Language and Linguistics: A Bibliography

Education in Somalia
History of Somalia
History of Africa
Ancient Somalia
Somali culture
African studies